St Sylvester's Church, Vauxhall is a Roman Catholic church in Liverpool, England. It is in Silvester Street in the Vauxhall area of the city. It is no longer in use.

It is a Gothic revival church designed by Pugin & Pugin. It was built in 1888–89 using red brick from Ruabon, Wales.

References

External links

Roman Catholic churches in Liverpool